Kristina Bannikova (born 15 June 1991) is an Estonian football player, who plays as a striker for Naiste Meistriliiga club Pärnu and the Estonia women's national football team.

International goals

References

External links

1991 births
Living people
Estonian women's footballers
Place of birth missing (living people)
Estonia women's international footballers
Women's association football forwards
Pärnu JK players